Apoorva Srinivasan is an Indian actress who works primarily in Telugu-language films. She is also a pilot, becoming the first to be an actress, then a pilot. She is known for her roles in Temper (2015) and Jyothi Lakshmi (2015).

Career 
In 2012, she won the Hyderabad Times Fresh Face contest and subsequently received several film offers including the Telugu-language film Temper (2015). She also played a supporting role opposite Priyadarshi Pulikonda in Tholi Prema (2018). She starred in the web series Chithram Vichitram on Zee5. She made her lead and Kannada debut with Randhawa (2019).

Filmography 
All films are in Telugu, unless otherwise noted.

Awards and nominations
1st IIFA Utsavam - Performance In A Supporting Role - Female - Temper - Nominated

References

External links 

Actresses in Telugu cinema
Actresses in Kannada cinema
Year of birth missing (living people)
Living people
Indian film actresses
21st-century Indian actresses